Arankhola Union is a union of Madhupur Upazila, Tangail District, Bangladesh. It is situated  15 km northeast of Madhupur and 65 km northeast of Tangail in the middle of the Madhupur tract.

Demographics

According to Population Census 2011 performed by Bangladesh Bureau of Statistics, The total population of Arankhola union is 59895. There are  15410 households in total.

Education

The literacy rate of Arankhola Union is 39.3% (Male-40.1%, Female-38.4%).

See also
 Union Councils of Tangail District

References

Populated places in Dhaka Division
Populated places in Tangail District
Unions of Madhupur Upazila